Stephania palaeosudamericana is an extinct species of angiosperm from the middle to late Paleocene of South America.

Distribution 
Fossils of the species have been found in the Bogotá Formation of the Altiplano Cundiboyacense and the Cerrejón Formation of the Cesar-Ranchería Basin, Colombia.

References

Bibliography 
 

†palaeosudamericana
Paleocene life
Itaboraian
Paleogene life of South America
Prehistoric plants of South America
Flora of Colombia
Fossils of Colombia
Paleogene Colombia
Cerrejón Formation
Altiplano Cundiboyacense
Fossil taxa described in 2011